John Joseph Salscheider (December 17, 1924 – May 14, 1998) was an American football halfback who played for the New York Giants in the National Football League (NFL). He played college football at St. Thomas University.

Professional career 
Salscheider was drafted 75th overall by the New York Giants in 1949. He played 11-of-12 possible games in his rookie season. Not only did he run and return, but he also punted. He ran 26 times for 105 yards, as well as punted 14 times for 495 yards. He also returned 15 kicks for 474 yards.

His only touchdown came in week six against the Chicago Cardinals when he returned a kickoff in the third quarter for a 95-yard touchdown. His return was the longest of the entire season. The return also helped him have the most yards per return for that season as well.

References 

1924 births
1998 deaths
American football halfbacks
New York Giants players